Jean Cantius Garand (January 1, 1888 – February 16, 1974), also known as John C. Garand, was a Québec-born designer of firearms who created the M1 Garand, a semi-automatic rifle that was widely used by the U.S. Army and U.S. Marine Corps during both World War II and the Korean War.

Early life
Garand was one of twelve children (six boys and six girls) born on a farm near St. Rémi, Quebec. His father moved to Jewett City, Connecticut, with the children when their mother died in 1899. All of the boys had the first name St. Jean le Baptiste, but only he went by the first name Jean. The other boys went by their middle names. Several of his brothers were also inventors. The children were employed in a textile mill where Jean learned to speak English while sweeping floors. Jean became interested in guns and learned to shoot after working at a shooting gallery. Jean learned machinist skills while working at the textile mill, and was hired by Browne and Sharpe, a Providence, Rhode Island, toolmaking company in 1909. Later, he found employment with a New York toolmaking firm in 1916, and resumed rifle practice at the shooting galleries along Broadway. Garand became a naturalized United States citizen in 1920.

Descendants of John Garand and his close friend General Julian Hatcher generally agree that it is the latter, rhyming approximately with 'errand'.

Designer of firearms

Garand's fondness for machinery and target shooting blended naturally into a hobby of designing guns, which took a more vocational turn in 1917. That year the United States Army took bids on designs for a light machine gun, and Garand's design was eventually selected by the War Department. Garand was appointed to a position with the United States Bureau of Standards in Washington D.C. with the task of perfecting the weapon. The first model was not built until 1919, too late for use in World War I, but the government kept employing Garand as an engineer with the Springfield Armory starting from November 4, 1919 until he retired in 1953.

 

In Springfield, Massachusetts,  Garand was tasked with designing a basic gas-actuated self-loading infantry rifle and carbine that would eject the spent cartridge and reload a new round based on a gas-operated system. Designing a rifle that was practical in terms of effectiveness, reliability, and production, stretched over time; it took fifteen years to perfect the M1 prototype model to meet all the U.S. Army specifications. The resulting Semiautomatic, Caliber .30, M1 Rifle was patented by Garand in 1932, approved by the U.S. Army on January 9, 1936, and went into mass production in 1940. It replaced the bolt-action M1903 Springfield and became the standard infantry rifle known as the Garand Rifle. During World War II, over four million M1 rifles were manufactured. The Garand Rifle proved to be an effective and reliable weapon and was praised by General MacArthur. General Patton wrote, "In my opinion, the M1 rifle is the greatest battle implement ever devised."

In the late 1940s and early 1950s, Garand had designed and built a prototype bullpup rifle. It fired the same cartridge as the M1, but the magazine, action and shape were completely different. It was a select-fire design, and had a firing rate of about 600rpm. When Garand retired in 1953, the second version of the T31 was incomplete, and remained so. The project was scrapped, and the gun was retired to the Springfield Armory museum in 1961. 
 
Garand never received any royalties from his M1 rifle design despite over six and a half million M1 rifles being manufactured as he transferred all rights regarding his inventions to the U.S. on January 20, 1936. A bill was introduced in Congress to award him $100,000 in appreciation, but it did not pass. Garand remained in his consulting position with the Springfield Armory until his retirement in 1953.

Personal life
Garand married French Canadian widow Nellie Bruce Shepard (August 3, 1900 – February 25, 1986) on September 6, 1930 in Albany, New York. She had two daughters by her previous marriage, and they had a daughter and a son of their own.

Garand died in Springfield, Massachusetts, on February 16, 1974, and was buried at Hillcrest Park Cemetery there.

Recognition

For his work with the Springfield Armory, Garand was awarded the Meritorious Civilian Service Award in 1941, the Alexander L. Holley Medal from the American Society of Mechanical Engineers, and the first Medal for Merit (together with Albert Hoyt Taylor) on March 28, 1944. In 1973, Garand was inducted into the U.S. Army Ordnance Corps Hall of Fame for designing the M1 Rifle or The Garand. The Hall of Fame entry acknowledges both Garand's inventive genius and engineering skills:

References

Further reading
He Invented the World's Deadliest Rifle, Popular Science, December 1940. 
Thomas A. Bruscino Jr. Chapter 1. M1 Garand Rifle. In: Jon T. Hoffman, (Ed.). A history of innovation: U.S. Army adaptation in war and peace . Center of Military History, United States Army, Washington, D.C., 2009, pp. 5–14.

External links

Springfield Armory Museum

1888 births
1974 deaths
People from Montérégie
Canadian people of French descent
Firearm designers
Medal for Merit recipients
People from Jewett City, Connecticut
Canadian emigrants to the United States